The following are the national records in athletics in Guinea Bissau maintained by its national athletics federation: Federação de Atletismo da Guiné-Bissau (FAGB).

Outdoor

Key to tables:

Men

Women

Indoor

Men

Women

References
General
World Athletics Statistic Handbook 2019: National Outdoor Records
World Athletics Statistic Handbook 2018: National Indoor Records
Specific

External links

Bissau-Guinean
Records